Al-Tahyryah is a sub-district located in As Sawadiyah District, Al Bayda Governorate, Yemen. Al-Tahyryah had a population of 3618 according to the 2004 census.

References 

Sub-districts in As Sawadiyah District